515th may refer to:

515th Air Defense Group, disbanded United States Air Force (USAF) organization
515th Air Mobility Operations Wing (515 AMOW), part of Air Mobility Command, stationed at Hickam Air Force Base, Hawaii
515th Bombardment Squadron, inactive United States Air Force unit
515th Parachute Infantry Regiment (United States), Regiment of the US Army during the Second World War
515th Strategic Fighter Squadron, inactive United States Air Force unit

See also
515 (number)
515 (disambiguation)
515, the year 515 (DXV) of the Julian calendar
515 BC